The 1972 SANFL Grand Final was an Australian rules football competition. North Adelaide beat Port Adelaide by 128 to 72.

Teams

References 

SANFL Grand Finals
SANFL Grand Final, 1972